Balgreen Halt railway station served Balgreen in the Scottish city of Edinburgh. Services were provided by trains on the Corstorphine Branch.

In 2014 the Edinburgh Tram system opened a tram stop named "Balgreen" adjacent to the site of the station.

History 
The station was opened by the London and North Eastern Railway in 1934. The line passed on to the Scottish Region of British Railways on nationalisation in 1948, to be then closed by the British Railways Board.

The site today 
The stationmaster's house remains standing, in the site which has been landscaped as part of a garden.

References

Notes

Sources 
 
 
 
 Balgreen Halt on navigable O. S. map Station marked at Saughton Hall
 Picture of the station

Disused railway stations in Edinburgh
Railway stations in Great Britain opened in 1934
Railway stations in Great Britain closed in 1968
Former London and North Eastern Railway stations